Saphenista cnemiodota is a species of moth of the family Tortricidae. It is found in Mexico (Tamaulipas, State of Mexico).

References

Moths described in 1994
Saphenista